Ryan Janes (born August 22, 1981) is a retired Canadian mixed martial artist. He most recently competed in the Middleweight division of the Ultimate Fighting Championship. A professional MMA competitor since 2008, he formerly competed for King of the Cage.

Background
Janes was born in Grand Falls-Windsor, Newfoundland, Canada and he earned a diploma in Computer Programming. He works full-time as a web developer for Canada provincial government and he is a professional MMA fighter under UFC promoter.

After Janes moved from Newfoundland to Victoria for a warmer climate to live, he joined a fitness gym and trained regularity to get in shape. However, the routine of weight training was unattractive to him and he signed up to an MMA gym in 2006. He felt in love with MMA soon after. Janes started competing after his coach, Adam Zugec, asked him if he was interested to compete and he jumped at the chance and never looked back since.

Mixed martial arts career

Early career 

Janes fought primarily in British Columbia under the King of the Cage Canada, Armageddon Fighting Championship, WSOF Canada and Battlefield Fight League. He was the Battlefield Fight League middleweight champion and he amassed a record of 8-1 prior signed by Ultimate Fighting Championship.

Ultimate Fighting Championship 

Janes was expected to make his promotional debut against Adam Hunter on August 27, 2016 at UFC on Fox 21.  However, the bout was cancelled after Hunter was flagged by USADA for potential drug violation.

Janes debut was rescheduled and was expected to faced Dongi Yang on October 15, 2016 at UFC Fight Night: Lamas vs. Penn. However, the promotion announced on October 6 that they had cancelled the event entirely.

After a long delay, Janes finally made his debut on December 9, 2016 at UFC Fight Night: Lewis vs. Abdurakhimov against Keith Berish. He won the fight by unanimous decision.

On February 19, 2017 Janes face Gerald Meerschaert at UFC Fight Night: Lewis vs. Browne.  He lost the fight via submission in the first round.

Janes faced Jack Marshman on July 16, 2017 at UFC Fight Night: Nelson vs. Ponzinibbio. He lost by unanimous decision (29-28, 29-28, 29-28).

Janes faced Andrew Sanchez on December 1, 2017 at The Ultimate Fighter 26 Finale. He won the fight via TKO in the third round.

On October 10, 2018, Janes announced his retirement from professional MMA competition.

Championships and accomplishments

Mixed martial arts
Battlefield Fight League
 Battlefield Fight League Middleweight Champion (One time) vs. Brendan Kornberger

Personal life 

Janes described himself as a 'big softy with no roughness to his edges and who loves hugs, comic books and superhero movies". He said most people could not connect him as a professional fighter with his gentle demeanor.  Janes is also a cat lover and he has two cats.

Mixed martial arts record

|Win
|align=center|10–3
|Andrew Sanchez
|TKO (punches)
|The Ultimate Fighter: A New World Champion Finale 
|
|align=center|3
|align=center|0:59
|Las Vegas, Nevada, United States
|
|-
|Loss
|align=center|9–3
|Jack Marshman
|Decision (unanimous)
|UFC Fight Night: Nelson vs. Ponzinibbio 
|
|align=center|3
|align=center|5:00
|Glasgow, Scotland
|
|-
| Loss
| align=center|  9–2
| Gerald Meerschaert
| Submission (armbar)
| UFC Fight Night: Lewis vs. Browne
| 
| align=center| 1
| align=center| 1:34
| Halifax, Nova Scotia, Canada
|
|-
| Win
| align=center|  9–1
| Keith Berish
| Decision (unanimous)
| UFC Fight Night: Lewis vs. Abdurakhimov
| 
| align=center| 3
| align=center| 5:00
| Albany, New York, United States
|
|-

| Win
| align=center|  8–1
| Brendan Kornberger
| Submission (rear-naked choke)
| Battlefield Fight League 37
| 
| align=center| 4
| align=center| 0:46
| Coquitlam, British Columbia, Canada
|
|-
| Win
| align=center|  7–1
| David Perron
| Submission (rear-naked choke)
| Battlefield Fight League 35
| 
| align=center| 2
| align=center| 4:38
| Vancouver, British Columbia, Canada
|
|-
| Win
| align=center|  6–1
| David Perron
| Submission (rear-naked choke)
| WSOF Canada 2
| 
| align=center| 1
| align=center| 4:23
| Edmonton, Alberta, Canada
|
|-
| Win
| align=center|  5–1
| Keto Allen
| Decision (unanimous)
| Armageddon Fighting Championship 13
| 
| align=center| 3
| align=center| 5:00
| Victoria, British Columbia, Canada
|
|-
| Win
| align=center|  4–1
| Marcus Hicks
| Submission (rear-naked choke)
| Armageddon Fighting Championship 8
| 
| align=center| 2
| align=center| 2:04
| Victoria, British Columbia, Canada
|
|-
| Win
| align=center|  3–1
| Duncan Wilson
| Submission (rear-naked choke)
| Armageddon Fighting Championship 6
| 
| align=center| 1
| align=center| 1:17
| Victoria, British Columbia, Canada
|
|-
| Win
| align=center| 2–1
| Geordie McCredie
| TKO (punches)
| King of the Cage Canada: Uprising 2
| 
| align=center| 1
| align=center| 1:33
| Nanaimo, British Columbia, Canada
|
|-
| Loss
| align=center| 1–1
| Mike Hackert
| Decision (unanimous)
| King of the Cage Canada: Island Pride
| 
| align=center| 3
| align=center| 5:00
| Nanaimo, British Columbia, Canada
|
|-
| Win
| align=center| 1–0
| Ryan Ballingall
| Submission (rear-naked choke)
| King of the Cage Canada: Impact
| 
| align=center| 1
| align=center| 0:55
| Nanaimo, British Columbia, Canada
|
|-

See also

 List of current UFC fighters
 List of male mixed martial artists
 List of Canadian UFC fighters

References

External links
 
 

Living people
1981 births
Canadian male mixed martial artists
Middleweight mixed martial artists
People from Grand Falls-Windsor
Canadian practitioners of Brazilian jiu-jitsu
People awarded a black belt in Brazilian jiu-jitsu
Ultimate Fighting Championship male fighters